Malaya Chagotma is a rural locality (a village) in Andreyevskoye Rural Settlement, Vashkinsky District, Vologda Oblast, Russia. The population was 10 as of 2002.

Geography 
Malaya Chagotma is located 38 km north of Lipin Bor (the district's administrative centre) by road. Bolshaya Chagotma is the nearest rural locality.

References 

Rural localities in Vashkinsky District